Gandhola Monastery (Gaṅdolā, also called Gondla, Gondhla, Kundlah, or Guru Ghantal Gompa) is about  before Keylong in Lahaul and Spiti district, Himachal Pradesh, India on the road from Manali, Himachal Pradesh. It is located on a hill above Tupchiling Village at the sacred junction of the Chandra and Bhaga rivers, which together form the Chandrabhaga or Chenab River. The village is at 3,160 m (10,370 ft) and is famous for its 7-storey tower fort.

History
The monastery is said to have been founded by Padmasambhava in the 8th century. It is now connected with the Drukpa Lineage of the Kagyu school of Tibetan Buddhism, but its history long precedes the formation of that sect. According to local tradition and also the terma, the Padma bka'i thang, discovered in 1326 in the Yarlung Valley by Urgyan Lingpa, the site was associated with Padmasambhava. But the site was a Buddhist establishment even earlier than that:

A chased copper goblet dated to the first century BCE was found here in 1857 by a Major Hay and is considered to be evidence of Buddhist monks' cells being located in a cave monastery at that time. The frieze on the vase denotes a chariot procession and is considered one of the oldest examples of metalwork to be decorated in this way in India. Known as the Kulu Vase, it is now kept in the British Museum. A damaged marble head of Avalokiteśvara also found here, is kept in the Guru Ghantal Monastery itself, and is claimed to date back to the time of Nagarjuna in the second century. This seems to be the only monastery in the region other than Sani Monastery in Zanskar which has a history which is claimed to go back to the era of the Kushan Empire.

There is also a black stone image of the goddess Vajreśvarī Devī, and a wooden statue of the Buddha said to have been installed by the monk Rinchen Zangpo (958-1055), a famous lotsawa (translator of Sanskrit Buddhist texts).

The monastery was originally probably a larger complex of purely Indian style of which nothing now remains. The present structure is two-storied, 17.3 x 11.6 metres facing the northwest. In 1959 the monastery underwent extensive repairs and a small pagoda roof of Kangra slates was added in a rather haphazard manner, which is surrounded by the mud roof which covers the monks' cells and kitchen on the second floor.

The monastery has distinctive wooden (as opposed to clay) idols of Padmasambhava, Brijeshwari Devi and several other lamas.

Gandhola, like all the Drukpa monasteries in Ladakh and Lahaul and Spiti, owes allegiance to the 12th Gyalwang Drukpa, abbot of Hemis Monastery in Ladakh, who, in turn, owes allegiance to the head of the order in Bhutan.

Gandhola is also famous for its seven story fort with alternating layers of stone and timber, which was once the seat of the local ṭhākur or chieftain, but is no longer occupied. It is a  walk from the village of Tupchilling, in which the monastery is set. it was built by Raja Man Singh, the ruler of the Kulu Kingdom in the early 1700s as a castle for the local ṭhākur.

Gallery

Footnotes

References
 Handa, O. C. (1987). Buddhist Monasteries in Himachal Pradesh. Indus Publishing Company, New Delhi. .
Kapadia, Harish. (1999). Spiti: Adventures in the Trans-Himalaya. Second Edition. Indus Publishing Company, New Delhi. .
 Janet Rizvi. (1996). Ladakh: Crossroads of High Asia. Second Edition. Oxford University Press, Delhi. .
 Cunningham, Alexander. (1854). LADĀK: Physical, Statistical, and Historical with Notices of the Surrounding Countries. London. Reprint: Sagar Publications (1977).
Francke, A. H. (1977). A History of Ladakh. (Originally published as, A History of Western Tibet, (1907). 1977 Edition with critical introduction and annotations by S. S. Gergan & F. M. Hassnain. Sterling Publishers, New Delhi.
Francke, A. H. (1914, 1926). Antiquities of Indian Tibet. Two Volumes. Calcutta. 1972 reprint: S. Chand, New Delhi.
Rose, H. A., et al. (1911). Glossary of the Tribes and Castes of the Punjab and North West Frontier Province. Reprint 1990. Asian Educational Services. .
 Sarina Singh, et al. India. (2007). 12th Edition. Lonely Planet. .

Buddhist monasteries in Himachal Pradesh
996 establishments
Drukpa Kagyu monasteries and temples
Buddhism in Lahaul and Spiti district
10th-century establishments in India
Buildings and structures in Lahaul and Spiti district